Kommil Foo is a Flemish cabaret duo, existing of two brothers Raf and Mich Walschaerts.

Awards
1992: the Camerettenprijs
1994: the CJP-podiumprijs
2005: Poelifinario

Programs
 Ballade (1988)
 Naakt op sokken (1990)
 J. van Gips (1992)
 Plank (1993)
 Akke-akke-tuut (Show for children, 1993)
 Neandertaal (1995)
 Bek! (1998)
 Andermans gelag (benefit for Amnesty International, 1998)
 10 jaar Kommil Foo (1998)
 IJdele Hoop (2000)
 Lof der Waanzin (2002)
 Wolfijzers en Schietgeweren (2004)
 Spaak (2005)
 In Concert (2006)
 Wolf (2008)

Discography
 Ballade (1988)
 Neandertaal (1995)
 Bek! (1998)
 Andermans gelag (1998)
 10 jaar Kommil Foo (1998)
 IJdele Hoop (2000)
 Lof der Waanzin (2002)
 Het beste live (2003)
 Wolfijzers en Schietgeweren (2004)
 Spaak (2005)
 Wolf (2008)

References

Cabaret performers
Living people
Flemish cabaret
Year of birth missing (living people)